Thomas Harding (born 31 August 1968, London) is a non-fiction author, journalist, and documentary maker. He holds joint British, American and German citizenship.

Career
Harding was educated at Westminster School in London and then studied anthropology and political science at Corpus Christi College, Cambridge. Alfred Alexander is his great-grandfather.  He is the great-nephew of Hanns Alexander.  It was only after Alexander's funeral in 2006 that Harding learned of what he had done during the Second World War.

Harding and his wife were joint CEOs and co-founders of the Oxford Channel, a local television channel operating under a Restricted Service Licence. In 2000, the board voted to sell the station and its operating company to Milestone Group. The station is no longer operational.

In December 2006 Harding became co-owner and publisher of the Shepherdstown Observer in West Virginia. In 2010 the newspaper won a Freedom of Information Act case before the West Virginia Supreme Court, which resulted in referendum petitions being released to it. While in the US, he helped develop the American Conservation Film Festival (ACFF), in partnership with the National Conservation Training Center.

In 2010 he convinced John Doyle, a delegate in the West Virginia House of Delegates, of the need for a state law protecting reporters' privilege not to reveal their sources; the reporters' shield bill sponsored by Doyle was passed by the West Virginia House and Senate in March 2011. In March 2011 he sold his interest in the paper.

His book Hanns and Rudolf: The German Jew and the Hunt for the Kommandant of Auschwitz was released in 2013.

His next book, Kadian Journal, was published in 2014; it is about his son, who died in a cycling accident. Doron Weber of the Washington Post described it as "a fine, brave book, a tough-minded, tender-hearted evocation of a beautiful boy, his all-too-short life and the impact of his death on a loving family. Harding has done his boy proud and turned nightmare into art." The House by the Lake, an account of the five families, including his grandmother, who resided in Alexander Haus, a house in Berlin, was published in 2015.

Blood on the Page was published in 2018. It is the investigation of the 2006 murder of the London-based author Allan Chappelow and the man found guilty of the crime Wang Yam. The murder trial was the first in modern British history to be held in secret. Harding's next book was Legacy published in 2019. It tells the story of J. Lyons and Co. which was founded and run by the author's family and at one time was the largest catering business in the world.

In 2020, Harding released two books for young readers: Future History: 2050 with the German publisher Jacoby & Stuart, and a picture-book adaptation of his 2015 The House by the Lake.

When Harding discovered that his mother's family had made money from plantations worked by enslaved people, he started research into Britain's role in slavery. This led to him publishing, in 2022, the book White Debt on the an uprising by enslaved people in Demerara in 1823.

Bibliography
 Hanns and Rudolf: The German Jew and the Hunt for the Kommandant of Auschwitz (London: Penguin Random House, 2013)
 Kadian Journal - A Father’s Story (Random House, 2014)
 The House By The Lake: Berlin. One House. Five Families. A Hundred years of History (Random House, 2015)
 Blood On The Page: A Murder, a Secret Trial, a Search for the Truth (Random House, 2018)
 Legacy: One Family, a Cup of Tea, and the Company who took on the World (Random House, 2019)
 The House By The Lake - picture book (Walker Books, 2020)
 Future History: 2050 (Jacoby & Stuart, 2020)
 White Debt: The Demerara Uprising and Britain’s Legacy of Slavery (Weidenfeld & Nicolson, 2022)

References

External links
Personal website

1968 births
Living people
British people of German-Jewish descent
People educated at Westminster School, London
Alumni of Corpus Christi College, Cambridge
Georgetown University alumni
British writers
British journalists
British documentary filmmakers